Jacques Garrigan was a bookseller in Avignon, France, in the 18th century.

Titles published by Garrigan

See also
 Books in France

References

External links
 Garrigan, Jacques (1725 – ). Consortium of European Research Libraries.

French booksellers
1725 births
Businesspeople from Avignon
Year of death missing